Sagittarius may refer to:
Sagittarius (constellation)
Sagittarius (astrology), a sign of the Zodiac

Ships
SuperStar Sagittarius, a cruise ship
USS Sagittarius (AKN-2), a World War II US Navy cargo ship

Music
Sagittarius (band), an American sunshine pop studio group
Ensemble Sagittarius, an ensemble conducted by Michel Laplénie

Fictional characters
Sagittarius (comics), member of Zodiac, an evil group in the Marvel Universe  
Sagittarius Aiolos, a character in Saint Seiya
Sagittarius, a Fairy Tail character

Zoology
Sagittarius serpentarius or secretarybird, a large, mostly terrestrial bird of prey
Sibynophis sagittarius, a species of snake found in South Asia

Other uses
Sagittarii, Ancient Roman archers
Sagittario or Sagittarius, a Beyblade toy

See also
Sagittarius Dwarf Galaxy (disambiguation)

Sagitta (disambiguation)
Sagittaria, a genus of about 20 species of aquatic plants 
Sagittarians (disambiguation)
Sagittiferidae, a family of acoelomorph worms 
, objects visually within the constellation, e.g. stars named ~ Sagitarii